6T or 6-T may references to:

6T, IATA code for Air Mandalay
6T Thunderbird; see  Triumph Thunderbird
6T SRAM (for 6 transistors); see 1T-SRAM
RDS-6t Truba warhead; see Joe 4
Ye-6T, one of the 1958 Mikoyan-Gurevich MiG-21 variants
2-8-6T locomotive; see 2-8-6
PRC-6T walkie-talkie; see AN/PRC-6
6T, the production code for the 1985 Doctor Who serial Attack of the Cybermen
OnePlus 6T, an Android-based smartphone manufactured by OnePlus

See also
T6 (disambiguation)